Pioneer Telephone Cooperative is a cooperatively owned telecommunications business that provides telephone service in a  region of western Oregon, including parts of four counties. The company has offices in Waldport and Philomath.

References

External links
Pioneer Telephone Cooperative

Telecommunications companies of the United States
Communications in Oregon